Terminal Tower is a skyscraper in Cleveland, Ohio, United States. It could also refer to:

Terminal Tower (Montreal), Canada
Terminal Tower (Linz), Austria
Terminal Tower (album), by the Cleveland-based rock group Pere Ubu